"After You've Gone" is a 1918 popular song composed by Turner Layton with lyrics by Henry Creamer.

History
It was recorded by Marion Harris on July 22, 1918, and released by Victor Records. 

The song became so popular that the sheet music was later decorated with tiny photographs of the 45 men who made the song famous, including Paul Whiteman, Rudy Vallée, B.A. Rolfe, Guy Lombardo, and Louis Armstrong.

Composition
The chorus adheres to a standard ABAC pattern but is only 20 measures long. There are four 4-bar phrases, followed by a 4 measure tag. The song is harmonically active, with chord changes almost every measure. The opening four notes are identical to the opening notes of "Peg o' My Heart" (1912) — at the time songwriters often borrowed the first few notes of a hit melody.

Notable recordings

See also
List of pre-1920 jazz standards

References

External links

"After You've Gone by Marion Harris, the original 1918 version at the Internet Archive
"After You've Gone" by Jelly Roll Morton at the Internet Archive
"After You've Gone" by Roy Eldridge Orchestra (1937) at the Internet Archive
"After You've Gone" Chord melody arrangement for guitar
free-scores.com

Songs about parting
Songs written by Turner Layton
Songs with lyrics by Henry Creamer
1918 songs
The Muppets songs
Bessie Smith songs
1910s jazz standards
Sophie Tucker songs
Judy Garland songs
Benny Goodman songs
Jazz compositions in B-flat major
Torch songs
United States National Recording Registry recordings